Thomas Merton was a twentieth-century Catholic monk, writer, and scholar of comparative religion.

Thomas Merton may also refer to:

 Thomas Ralph Merton (1888–1969) English physicist and inventor

See also

Thomas Morton (disambiguation)